David Alexander Sy Licauco (born June 15, 1995), more popularly known as David Licauco, is a Filipino actor and model. He is known for portraying Malik for GMA television drama Mulawin vs. Ravena (2017) and Fidel de los Reyes y Maglipol in Maria Clara at Ibarra (2022–2023) and dubbed as Pambansang Ginoo.

Early life
Born to Jolan Alexander Licauco and Eden Sy Licauco with Chinese Filipino ancestry, he is the second eldest among his siblings. His siblings are composed of Elan Alyssandra, Jean Arianne May, and James Daniel. He is one of the grandchildren of Jaime Licauco, an internationally known parapsychologist, newspaper columnist, author, lecturer, hypnotherapist, and consultant.

In 2014, he started his career as a model after he won 1st runner-up in Mr. and Ms. Chinatown. Licauco finished high school at Grace Christian College, and then finished college at De La Salle–College of Saint Benilde with the degree of Bachelor of Science in Business Administration Major in Computer Applications last 2016.

Career

2014-2016: Career beginnings 
Prior to becoming a TV actor and a professional model, Licauco started modelling inside the campus for several school event posters. His modelling flair was discovered in the shores of Boracay. He then landed a modelling job via Mr. and Ms. Chinatown on ABS-CBN which opened him opportunities in modelling and acting. In the succeeding months, he walked for several fashion shows such as those of Cosmopolitan, Coca-Cola, and Bench, and graced magazine covers including Candy Magazine, Chalk Magazine, and Garage Magazine.

Although Licauco had been a constant face in fashion shows and magazine covers, in 2014 he made his acting debut in  the movie The Amazing Praybeyt Benjamin topbilled by Vice Ganda. In the succeeding year he made a cameo in the television series FlordeLiza aired on ABS-CBN followed by playing small roles in Ipaglaban Mo!, Magpakailanman and Karelasyon in 2016.

2017–2021: Rising popularity
In 2017, Licauco starred in the television fantaserye Mulawin vs Ravena. After landing the role of Malik, Licauco's popularity skyrocketed, launching him into stardom. Because of this, he landed consecutive roles in the television series Kapag Nahati ang Puso and TODA One I Love.

In 2021, Licauco received his first leading role in GMA Network's romantic comedy series Heartful Café. It premiered  on April 26, 2021, on the network's Telebabad line up.

2022-present: Sparkle artist

In 2022, Licauco received his breakthrough role in Maria Clara at Ibarra where he starred as Fidel de los Reyes, the mischievous friend of the character Crisostomo Ibarra (played by Dennis Trillo) and potential love interest of Klay Infantes (Barbie Forteza). His performance was tagged by various media outlets as the "New Philippine Superstar not for his boy-next-door looks, but on-point acting skills." Licauco also sang the official theme song for the FiLay love team in the show entitled "Kailangan Kita", which was released on December 23, 2022. The theme song is under GMA Music and GMA Playlist.

On November 22, 2022, Licauco renewed his contract with Sparkle GMA Artist Center.

Filmography

Film

Discography 
  2021 - It's the Best Thing (OST - Heartful Cafe)
  2022 - Kailangan Kita (#FiLay Theme Song - Maria Clara at Ibarra OST)

Television Series

Accolades and Recognitions
 36th PMPC Star Awards: New Movie Actor of the Year (2021) - Because I Love You 
 Asia's Pinnacle Awards 2022: Most Oustanding Entrepreneur for Flavorful Comfort Food - Sobra Café Molito (2022) 
 2023 Platinum Stallion National Media Awards: Best Actor in a Supporting Role (2023) - Maria Clara at Ibarra

References

External links
 Sparkle GMA Artist Center profile
 
 
 

Living people
1994 births
21st-century Filipino male actors
De La Salle–College of Saint Benilde alumni
Filipino actors of Chinese descent
Filipino male models
Filipino male television actors
Filipino people of Chinese descent
GMA Network personalities
Place of birth missing (living people)
Star Magic personalities